Nothophryne is a genus of frogs known as mongrel frogs. They are found in southern Malawi and northern Mozambique. Until 2018, only one species in the genus was known, Nothophryne broadleyi. , there are five known species:

Nothophryne baylissi Conradie, Bittencourt-Silva, Farooq, Loader, Menegon, and Tolley, 2018
Nothophryne broadleyi Poynton, 1963
Nothophryne inagoensis Conradie, Bittencourt-Silva, Farooq, Loader, Menegon, and Tolley, 2018
Nothophryne ribauensis Conradie, Bittencourt-Silva, Farooq, Loader, Menegon, and Tolley, 2018
Nothophryne unilurio Conradie, Bittencourt-Silva, Farooq, Loader, Menegon, and Tolley, 2018

References

Pyxicephalidae